Colubrina beccariana is a tree of tropical Asia in the family Rhamnaceae. It is named for the Italian botanist Odoardo Beccari.

Description
Its brown bark is smooth to dimpled.

Distribution and habitat
Colubrina beccariana grows naturally in Peninsular Malaysia and Borneo. Its habitat is lowland rainforest.

References

beccariana
Trees of Peninsular Malaysia
Trees of Borneo
Plants described in 1891